Group A of the 1991 FIFA Women's World Cup took place from 16 to 21 November 1991. The group consisted of hosts China PR, Denmark, New Zealand and Norway.

Standings

Matches
All times listed are local, CST (UTC+8).

China PR vs Norway

Denmark vs New Zealand

Norway vs New Zealand

China PR vs Denmark

China PR vs New Zealand

Norway vs Denmark

References

External links
FIFA Women's World Cup China PR 1991, FIFA.com

1991 FIFA Women's World Cup
China at the 1991 FIFA Women's World Cup
Denmark at the 1991 FIFA Women's World Cup
New Zealand at the 1991 FIFA Women's World Cup
Norway at the 1991 FIFA Women's World Cup